Jack Davie (5 October 1874 – 27 October 1922) was an  Australian rules footballer who played with Geelong in the Victorian Football League (VFL).

Notes

External links 

1874 births
1922 deaths
Australian rules footballers from Victoria (Australia)
Geelong Football Club players
Geelong West Football Club players